Clive Ford (born 10 April 1945) is an English former professional footballer who played as a forward.

Career
Born in Hateley Heath, Ford began as an apprentice at Wolverhampton Wanderers, turning professional in 1964. He later played in the Football League for Walsall and Lincoln City, before playing in the North American Soccer League with the Los Angeles Wolves. Ford returned to the UK after one season to play non-League football with Cambridge City.

External links

NASL career stats

1945 births
Living people
English footballers
Wolverhampton Wanderers F.C. players
Walsall F.C. players
Lincoln City F.C. players
Los Angeles Wolves players
Cambridge City F.C. players
English Football League players
North American Soccer League (1968–1984) players
Association football forwards
English expatriate sportspeople in the United States
Expatriate soccer players in the United States
English expatriate footballers